Michael Jenkins (born December 7, 1973 in Arlington, Texas) is an American sportscaster. He is currently co-host of "The Daily Tip," a national sports betting radio show for Audacy. Previously, he was co-host of "The Daily Line," a sports betting show airing on NBC Sports Radio and NBC Sports Regional Networks after having anchored numerous shows for 14 years at NBC Sports Washington.

Biography

Jenkins spent most of his childhood years in Breckenridge, Texas. He graduated from Breckenridge High School where he served as class president and was voted "Best All-Around" his senior year. His first broadcasting job came as an 8th grader when he was hired to host a Sunday morning gospel show on a local AM radio station. He received both his bachelor's and master's degree in journalism at the University of Texas at Austin in Austin, Texas.

After graduating, Jenkins moved to Denison, Texas, to work as an anchor/reporter for KTEN-TV. He later moved to Boise, Idaho and worked as a reporter for KTVB-TV.

Jenkins returned to Austin, Texas, as an anchor/reporter for KVUE-TV in 1998 and worked as a journalism professor for four years at Austin Community College. In addition, he served as a voice for the Texas Lottery and hosted a local talent show called "Gimme the Mike." While working at KVUE-TV, Jenkins was a four-time recipient of the RTNDA/Edward R. Murrow Award for both sports and news reporting. He also won a national award from the National Cowboy and Western Heritage Museum for his story about real-life cowboys.

In 2004, Jenkins moved to Washington, D.C. to join NBC Sports Washington as an anchor/reporter and has since won nine Emmy Awards, four times claiming the region's top prize for sports anchoring while also winning for sports daily program, program host, sports reporting, and sports-news story. Dan Steinberg of The Washington Post once called him "the best fan reporter in the world."

In 2016, a video of Jenkins went viral after he pretended to drink alcohol on-air while lamenting the Washington Capitals being eliminated from the Stanley Cup playoffs, with Dan Patrick of NBC Sports subsequently referring to Jenkins as "sportscasting's Ron Burgundy."

Jenkins is also a cancer survivor, having been diagnosed with a Wilms' tumor in 1981.

References

Living people
1973 births
American television sports announcers
Television anchors from Washington, D.C.
Moody College of Communication alumni
People from Arlington, Texas
People from Breckenridge, Texas